The 2018–19 World Rugby Women's Sevens Series was the seventh edition of the global circuit for women's national rugby sevens teams, organised by World Rugby. There were six tournament events scheduled on the 2018–19 circuit with twelve teams competing in each tournament. The series also, for the second time, doubled as an Olympic qualifier.

The series was won by  who won four tour events on their way to claiming their fifth World Series title.

Format
Twelve teams compete at each event. The top-ranked teams at each tournament play off for a Cup, with gold, silver and bronze medals also awarded to the first three teams. Lower-ranked teams at each tournament play off for a Challenge Trophy. The overall winner of the series was  determined by points gained from the standings across all events in the season.

Teams
The "core teams" qualified to participate in all series events for the 2018–19 series were:

 
 
 
 
 

 
 
 
 
 

One additional core team qualified through winning the 2018 Hong Kong Women's Sevens:
 

The twelfth team in each tournament is allocated based on performance in the respective continental competitions within Africa, Asia, Europe, Oceania, and the Americas.

Tour venues
There were six tournaments in 2018–19:

Standings

Official standings for the 2018–19 series:

Source: World Rugby

{| class="wikitable" style="font-size:92%;"
|-
!colspan=2| Legend 
|-
| No colour
|Core team in 2018–19 and re-qualified as a core team for the 2019–20 World Rugby Women's Sevens Series
|-
|bgcolor=#fcc|Pink
||Relegated as the lowest placed core team at the end of the 2018–19 series
|-
|bgcolor=#ffc|Yellow
|Invitational team
|-
|colspan=2 style="border-left:3px solid #06f;"| Qualified to the 2020 Olympic Sevens as one of the four highest placed eligible teams from the 2018–19 series.
|}

Placings summary
Tallies of top four tournament placings during the 2018–19 series, by team:

Tournaments

Glendale

Dubai

Sydney

Kitakyushu

Langford

Biarritz

Players

Scoring leaders

Updated: 16 June 2019

Awards  

Updated: 16 June 2019

See also

 2018–19 World Rugby Sevens Series (for men) 
 2019 Hong Kong Women's Sevens
 Rugby sevens at the 2020 Summer Olympics – Women's qualification

Notes

References

 
2018
2018 rugby sevens competitions
2019 rugby sevens competitions
2018 in women's rugby union
2019 in women's rugby union
World Series